The Massachusetts Division of Fisheries and Wildlife, sometimes referred to as MassWildlife, is an agency of the Massachusetts Department of Fish and Game, within the Executive Office of Energy and Environmental Affairs. The Massachusetts Division of Fisheries and Wildlife (DFW) is responsible for the conservation - including restoration, protection and management - of fish and wildlife resources for the benefit and enjoyment of the public. MassWildlife was founded as a state fisheries commission in 1866 in response to citizen concerns about the loss of Atlantic salmon to dams and pollution. The agency's activities are mainly supported by revenue from the sale of hunting, trapping and fishing licenses, stamps and permits; returns from federal taxes on hunting and fishing equipment; various bond initiatives (primarily for land purchase. Additional funding is derived from voluntary donations from businesses, conservation organizations, and individuals.

The conservation - including protection, restoration, and management - of Massachusetts' fauna and flora is the statutory responsibility of MassWildlife.  Specifically, MassWildlife's charge is the stewardship of all wild amphibians, reptiles, birds, mammals, and freshwater and diadromous fishes in the state, as well as endangered, threatened, and special concern species, including native wild plants and invertebrates.  This responsibility is established and articulated in the Constitution and General Laws of Massachusetts.
MassWildlife is overseen by a seven-member Fisheries and Wildlife Board appointed by the Governor. Under Chapter 21, the Board supervises and controls the agency, having the authority to make regulations, sets policy, and oversees personnel appointments. The Board meets monthly and holds public hearings as part of the regulatory process. All meetings and hearings are posted on the agency website as well as at agency facilities.

WMAs are all open to hunting, fishing, trapping and other outdoor recreation activities. Sanctuaries are more restrictive—camping, hunting, fishing and trapping is prohibited.

MassWildlife runs fish hatcheries in Sandwich, Belchertown, Montague and Sunderland. Rainbow, brown, brook and tiger trout are raised to stock various state waters.

Mass Wildlife's website has information on regulations and permits for hunting, fishing, trapping and recreational land use. In addition there are maps of wildlife management locations and information on wildlife viewing. The agency also publishes the quarterly magazine Massachusetts Wildlife which has excellent photos and articles on state flora and fauna. 
MassWildlife also publishes the following:
Booklets
Field Guide to Animals in Vernal Pools
Wildlife Sanctuaries
Living Waters
Town Core Habitat Reports, 2004
Classification of the Natural Communities of Massachusetts Reprinted 2004
Maps/Atlases
Natural Heritage Rare Species & Habitat Atlas
Town Core Habitat Maps
Aerial Photo Survey of Potential Vernal Pools in Massachusetts (CD Viewer)
Pond Maps
Wildlife Management Area Maps
Posters
Living Waters Poster
BioMap Poster
Flyers/Lists
Landowner Incentive Program
Rare Species List

References

About MassWildlife, Mass.gov  For reference see A Guide to the Massachusetts Public Records Law, published by the office of the Secretary of the Commonwealth.

External links
 MassWildlife HomePage on the Official Website of the Department of Fish and Game
 Official Website of the Department of Fish and Game
 Executive Office of Energy and Environmental Affairs
 Massachusetts Fish & Wildlife Guide to Hunting, Freshwater Fishing & Trapping
 Official DFW Hunting Regulations
 Official DFW Freshwater Fishing Regulations
 Official DFW Saltwater Fishing Regulations

State agencies of Massachusetts